Telehomecare (THC) is a subfield within telehealth. It involves the delivery of healthcare services to patients at home through the use of telecommunications technologies, which enable the interaction of voice, video, and health-related data. The management of care is done from an external site by a healthcare professional.

It is often interchanged with remote patient monitoring; however, telehomecare is not strictly patient monitoring because it incorporates a range of health care delivery through education, emotional and social support, information dissemination, and self-care help and suggestions. The implementation of THC helps to better manage patients with chronic health conditions such as heart disease, COPD, diabetes, etc., and less visits to primary healthcare services can result. THC increases the accessibility to health care services especially as the need for home care rises with the aging population.  Additionally, THC can help create networks of services between hospitals and primary care providers, thereby allowing patients better access to services. In addition to improving the management of chronic conditions and increasing access to healthcare, THC is believed to reduce costs of healthcare.

THC technology is designed to meet the needs of a range of patients. There can be patients requiring minimal monitoring or very sophisticated monitoring. A system can consist of a small unit to which one or more peripheral devices are connected. This can include a blood-pressure monitor, wireless or wired weight scale, wireless glucometer, wireless pulse oximeter, peak flow meter or stethoscope.

A THC unit can collect data on vital signs and health information from patients who entered values into the system. This is done manually or directly through the supplied peripherals. The data is transferred through telephone lines to a secure server located at the manufacturer's data centre. The data is then uploaded to a secure web-based application, allowing healthcare professionals to access and review patient information from any location with Internet access.

Applications
Based on research conducted in the United States by the Capital Area Consortium on Aging and Disability, the bandwidth of 128 kbs was useful in a wide range of medical and nursing applications of THC. This includes:

 Patient interviews, histories, review of systems, activities of daily living;
 Follow-up assessment for functional mental status;
 Interventions not requiring physical presence;
 Supervision of physician assistants and nurse practitioners;
 Consultation with nursing colleagues and auxiliary services (physical therapy and occupational therapy);
 Medical consultations;
 Medication compliance;
 Patient education;
 Facilitation of case management;
 Triage in lieu of transport to emergency room or office; and
 Monitoring of vital signs, oximetry, electrocardiogram (ECG).

One of the applications of THC is providing nursing care using telephones, televisions, computers, and videoconferencing.  THC can potentially improve patients outcomes, increase health care providers' productivity, and reduce health care costs.  This application may be referred to as telenursing.

Cost-effectiveness
THC has demonstrated a significant impact on hospital admissions and emergency room visits, as well as, walk-in clinic visits. Ontario Telemedicine Network (OTN) conducted a trial program that involved more than 800 patients with one of two chronic diseases - Congestive Heart Failure or COPD. The results were:
 65% reduction in the number of hospital admissions;
 72% reduction in the number of Emergency Room visits; and
 95% reduction in the number of walk-in clinic visits.OTN

THC offers the opportunity to shift the delivery of many health care services from hospitals and other healthcare facilities to patients' homes, thus reducing the load on the healthcare system and reserving hospitals for more critical cases. A recent study in The Journal of Telemedicine and Telecare showed that very few studies have evaluated the cost-effectiveness of THC, therefore, more research is needed to assess the value of THC in reducing costs associated with chronic disease management.

References

Health Canada
Types of health care facilities
Telehealth
Telemedicine